is a railway station in the city of Nagaoka, Niigata, Japan, operated by East Japan Railway Company (JR East).

Lines
Miyauchi Station is served by the Shin'etsu Main Line and the Jōetsu Line.

Station layout
The station consists of one ground-level side platform and two island platforms serving five tracks. The platforms are connected by a footbridge. The station has a Midori no Madoguchi  staffed ticket office.

Platforms

History 
The station opened on 27 December 1898. With the privatization of Japanese National Railways (JNR) on 1 April 1987, the station came under the control of JR East. The current station building was completed in 1992.

Passenger statistics
In fiscal 2017, the station was used by an average of 972 passengers daily (boarding passengers only).

Surrounding area
Miyauchi Post Office
Miyauchi Elementary School
Miyauchi Middle School
Nagaoka Ginger Ramen
Settaya - district famous for Kura (storehouse) and Sake

See also
 List of railway stations in Japan

References

External links

 Miyauchi Station (JR East) 

Railway stations in Nagaoka, Niigata
Railway stations in Japan opened in 1898
Stations of East Japan Railway Company
Shin'etsu Main Line
Jōetsu Line